Schott NYC (Schott Bros) is an American clothing manufacturing company located in New York City. The company was founded in 1913 by brothers Irving and Jack Schott. Schott NYC was the first company to put a zipper on a jacket and they created the classic Perfecto motorcycle jacket, which was made popular by films such as The Wild One (1953). The company made clothing for the United States Armed Forces during World War II and later also for American law enforcement. Schott NYC is still owned by the Schott family and still manufacture much of their clothing in the United States.

The Perfecto motorcycle jacket

Schott NYC is perhaps most well known for their Perfecto motorcycle jackets. In 1928 Irving Schott designed and produced the first ever leather motorcycle jacket, he named it the "Perfecto" after his favorite cigar. The jackets were made out of horsehide, had a belted front, D-pocket, flap change pocket, zippered sleeve cuffs and shoulder epaulettes. This classic motorcycle jacket was a double riders jacket design which meant that one part of the front zipper was located a couple of inches in. When zipped up this created a seal where no air would pass through when riding a motorcycle.

In the late 1940s a new design was introduced - the 613. It was nicknamed "the One Star" because it had a star on each shoulder epaulette. In the early 1950s another version of the jacket was introduced - the 618. The 618 had no stars on the shoulder epaulettes. Stores that carried the jackets often had problems with people stealing the stars of the 613 so the 618 became more commercially viable. Marlon Brando wore a 618 in the movie The Wild One (1953), the stars on his jacket were not original but added to the jacket. There has been no word on where this jacket is today. Because of the film, which was the first outlaw biker movie, the black motorcycle jacket became synonymous with bad attitude and was banned from many American schools during the 1950s.

U.S. seminal punk rock band The Ramones wore Schott Perfecto leather jackets as part of their distinctive uniform look. Japanese rock band Guitar Wolf have their own 613 Perfecto design called 613GW.

Other classic jacket designs
During World War II Schott NYC (being one of several contractors) manufactured the wool naval pea coat for the US Navy. These classic designs are still manufactured by Schott NYC today. Another classic jacket design manufactured by the company is the Café racer leather motorcycle jacket. Café racer jackets are single rider jackets that have a stand-up collar. Peter Fonda wore a Café racer style jacket in the movie Easy Rider (1969).

External links

References

Clothing companies of the United States
Manufacturing companies based in New York City
Clothing companies established in 1913
1913 establishments in New York City